Ko Tae-won (born 10 May 1993) is a South Korean footballer who plays as a centre-back for Jeonnam Dragons.

Career
Ko joined K League 1 side Jeonnam Dragons in January 2016.

References

External links 

1993 births
Living people
Association football central defenders
South Korean footballers
Jeonnam Dragons players
Gimcheon Sangmu FC players
K League 1 players
K League 2 players